Eric Swinkels (born 30 March 1949) is a Dutch sport shooter and Olympic medalist. He won a silver medal in skeet shooting at the 1976 Summer Olympics in Montreal.  He competed in six different Olympic competitions, beginning in 1972 and ending in 1996.

See also
 List of athletes with the most appearances at Olympic Games

References

Living people
1949 births
Dutch male sport shooters
Skeet shooters
Olympic shooters of the Netherlands
Olympic silver medalists for the Netherlands
People from Best, Netherlands
Shooters at the 1972 Summer Olympics
Shooters at the 1976 Summer Olympics
Shooters at the 1984 Summer Olympics
Shooters at the 1988 Summer Olympics
Shooters at the 1992 Summer Olympics
Shooters at the 1996 Summer Olympics
Olympic medalists in shooting
Medalists at the 1976 Summer Olympics
Sportspeople from North Brabant
20th-century Dutch people